William W. Warner (April 2, 1920 – April 18, 2008) was an American biologist and writer. He was awarded the 1977 Pulitzer Prize for General Nonfiction for his first book Beautiful Swimmers: Watermen, Crabs and the Chesapeake Bay, which was based on his experiences living and working among crab fishermen on the Chesapeake.

Warner was a 1943 graduate of Princeton University. During World War II, Warner served in the Pacific Theater of operations as an aerial photograph analyst with a Marine air group.

Works
 Beautiful Swimmers: Watermen, Crabs, and the Chesapeake Bay (1976)
 Distant Water: The Fate of the North Atlantic Fisherman (1983)
 Into the Porcupine Cave and Other Odysseys: Adventures of an Occasional Naturalist (1999, short stories)
 At Peace with All Their Neighbors: Catholics and Catholicism in the National Capital, 1787–1860 (1994)

References

1920 births
2008 deaths
American biologists
Pulitzer Prize for General Non-Fiction winners
20th-century American non-fiction writers
Princeton University alumni
20th-century biologists